Paul Martin is an American politician. He served as a Republican member for the Franklin-5 district of the Vermont House of Representatives.

Life and career 
In 2021, Martin was elected to the Franklin-5 district of the Vermont House of Representatives, succeeding Charen Fegard. He earned 30.7 percentage of the votes.

In 2022, citing a "lack of time", Martin resigned and was succeeded by Wayne Laroche. He is a real estate agent.

References 

Living people
Year of birth missing (living people)
Place of birth missing (living people)
Republican Party members of the Vermont House of Representatives
21st-century American politicians
American real estate brokers